Fryderyk Gerbowski (born 17 January 2003) is a Polish professional footballer who plays as a midfielder for Stal Mielec, on loan from Wisła Płock.

Career statistics

Club

Notes

References

2003 births
Living people
Footballers from Warsaw
Polish footballers
Poland youth international footballers
Poland under-21 international footballers
Association football midfielders
Ekstraklasa players
Wisła Płock players
Stal Mielec players